The Germany men's national field hockey team is one of the most successful sides in the world, winning gold at the Summer Olympics four times (including once as West Germany), the Hockey World Cup 3 times, the EuroHockey Nations Championship eight times (including twice as West Germany) and the Hockey Champions Trophy nine times (including three times as West Germany).

History
The team caused an upset in the 2002 Men's Hockey World Cup when they defeated Australia 2–1 with striker Olivier Domke scoring the winner after Germany came back from being 1–0 down. After this period the Germans went through a transition period, finishing lowly in the 2003 Men's Hockey Champions Trophy and the 2004 Men's Hockey Champions Trophy with several inexperienced players in their squad. Coach Bernhard Peters was looking to nurture the players for the World Cup such as Christopher Zeller, Moritz Fürste and Timo Wess, and was successful as the Germans won the 2006 Men's Hockey World Cup in Mönchengladbach, defeating Australia 4–3 in the final. Bernhard Peters left the team in order to pursue a career in football and is now a staff member at TSG 1899 Hoffenheim.

On 6 November 2006, Markus Wiese was appointed as the new head coach. Success at the 2007 Men's Hockey Champions Trophy and a gold medal at the 2008 Beijing Olympics followed this. Germany headed into the 2010 Men's Hockey World Cup with a largely young and inexperienced squad but reached the final of the World Cup after strong performances throughout the tournament. In the final, they were defeated 2–1 by Australia.

Germany has played in the annual 2011 Hockey Champions Trophy held in Auckland, New Zealand. The team competed in pool B with Korea, Netherlands and host nation New Zealand. The team finished fifth in the tournament.

Competitive record

Summer Olympics
 1908–1952 as  →  →  → 
 1956–1964 as 
 1968–1988 as 
 1992–present as

World Cup
 1971–1990 as 
 1994–present as

European Championships
1970–1987 as 
1991–present as

FIH Pro League

Sultan Azlan Shah Cup
1987 as 
1995–present as

Defunct competitions

Champions Trophy
1978–1989 as 
1990–present as

Hockey World League

*Draws include matches decided on a penalty shoot-out.

Team

Current squad
The following 18 players were named on 6 December 2022 for the 2023 World Cup from 13 to 29 January 2023 in Bhubaneswar and Rourkela, India.

Head coach: André Henning

Recent call-ups
The following players have been called up for the national team in the last 12 months.

Coaches

See also
East Germany men's national field hockey team
Germany men's national under-21 field hockey team
Germany women's national field hockey team

References

External links

FIH profile

Field hockey
National team
European men's national field hockey teams
Men's sport in Germany